Almost Free is the third studio album by American skate punk band Fidlar, released on January 25, 2019. The album was recorded at Sunset Sound Studios in Hollywood, and produced by Ricky Reed.

Background
On recording the album, frontman Zac Carper said in an interview with Kerrang!s Chris Krovatin that:

Speaking to Kat Corbett on KROQ Radio during an October 2018 interview, guitarist Elvis Kuehn and drummer Max Kuehn stated that Jane's Addiction drummer Stephen Perkins plays drums on a track on the album.

In a September 2018 interview with Upset Magazine, on the upcoming record and its sound, Carper said "it's our most diverse record, 100%, more so than Too, more so than our first record [...] We have horns on this record, fucking trumpets and saxophones and trombones and shit; we went for it. We just completely fucking went for it, so I'm excited for it to come out."

Speaking of the album in general, Kuehn stated in a press release that "Almost Free feels like a step forward for us in a lot of ways. We tried to be true to ourselves and let the music come out naturally, without fear of how people would receive it."

Elvis Kuehn, in a mid-December 2018 interview with Flood Magazine, said about the album title: "It was sort of about music being devalued. People don't really buy music as much nowadays. It just kept sticking with us when we thought about other options, because it has so many other meanings too."

Critical reception 

Kerrang!s David McLaughlin giving the album a positive review of 5 out of 5, stating that the mixed variety of sounds, and themes on the record are "All of which makes Almost Free an absolute joy to behold. It’s a trip to listen to, and an instant modern classic."

Hannah Mylrea, writing for NME, gave a 4/5 star review to the album, comments that this album is a bold new choice for music fans and brings fresh influences.

Similarly, Charlie Sinclair for Gigwise also gave the album a positive review of 9/10, and stated that "lyrically Carper is at his best, exploring his sobriety in terms of both his own mental psyche and the direct effect it's having on those around him. Standout track 'Kick' serves as a bleak look at the life of an addict desperate to stay on the straight and narrow."

Timothy Michalik of Under the Radar, gave the album a negative review of 3/10, saying "Almost Free finds FIDLAR, the SoCal corporate-punks that at one point made endearing and charming pop-punk, ripping off Beastie Boys' worst tendencies and creative scapegoats" as well as stating that "Every move FIDLAR has made following their full-length debut, FIDLAR, sounds calculated, as if it was drafted up in a dingy, strip mall marketing office by a pair of washed-out hacks who no longer understand what is relevant."

Track listing 

Source:

Personnel 
Credits adapted from Almost Free liner notes.

Fidlar
 Zac Carper – vocals, guitar, "laptop", "raw data", OP1
 Elvis Kuehn – guitar, vocals, piano, dobro, "note bending"
 Brandon Schwartzel – bass guitar, "ballistic missile alarm", "church harmonies"
 Max Kuehn – drums, percussion, "Tom Shaman"

Production
Neal Avron – mixer 
 Zac Carper – producer 
 Sam Eaton – producer  
 Chris Gehringer – mastering
 Bill Malina – engineer 
Manny Marroquin – mixer 
Ricky Reed – producer , mixer 
 Ethan Shumaker – engineer 
 Jerry Ordonez – engineer

Charts
Weekly charts

 Singles

References 

2019 albums
Fidlar albums
Dine Alone Records albums
Mom + Pop Music albums
Albums produced by Ricky Reed